Strobilacea may refer to:

Acanthostachys strobilacea
Aechmea strobilacea
Amanoa strobilacea
Boschniakia strobilacea
Ephedra strobilacea
Platycarya strobilacea